The Silver Ghost is a model of Rolls-Royce automobile.

Silver Ghost may also refer to:

 Silver Ghosts, a fictional race of aliens in the Xeelee Sequence
 Silver Ghost (comics), a minor supervillain in the DC Universe
 Silver Ghost, a tactical role-playing video game published by Kure Software Koubou
 Silver Ghost (public house), a pub in England
 Sthenopis argenteomaculatus, the silver-spotted ghost moth
 an epithet for a character in the Community episode Modern Espionage